This is the discography of American singer Iggy Pop. The following lists of all of Pop's released singles, studio albums, compilation albums, EPs and demos.

Studio albums
 All releases are credited to Iggy Pop as solo works unless stated otherwise.

EPs

Live albums

Compilation albums

Box sets

Singles

1977–1988

1990–2022

As featured artist

Contributions

As primary artist

Guest appearances

Albums

Songs

Other releases

Albums 
Live in the Cover (Skydog, France, 1993) – same release as We Are Not Talking About Commercial Shit! (Skydog, France, 1995).
Nuggets (UK, Jungle Records, 1999)
I Wanna Be Your Dog EP (Skydog, France, 2006) – six versions of "I Wanna Be Your Dog".
Gimme Some Skin (US, Cleopatra Records, 2014) – CD / 7x7" 45 RPM box set.

Songs 

 "Rebel Rebel" (2010) – promo single credited to Darkos, Pop's character in Arthur 3: The War of the Two Worlds.
"White Christmas (Guitar Stooge Version)" (2013) – alternate take of "White Christmas" for album Psych-Out Christmas.

References

 
Discographies of American artists
Punk rock discographies